Offerings: A Worship Album is a worship album by Christian rock band Third Day, and is their fourth studio album. The album features several new songs, covers, and live versions of their previous songs.

Track listing

Personnel 

Third Day
 Mac Powell – acoustic guitar, lead vocals
 Brad Avery – guitars, backing vocals
 Mark Lee – guitars, backing vocals
 Tai Anderson – bass, backing vocals
 David Carr – drums, percussion

Additional personnel

 Monroe Jones – keyboards (1, 7)
 Geof Barkley – keyboards, organ and backing vocals (3, 4, 6, 8, 11)
 Scotty Wilbanks – keyboards (5), pump organ (10), penny whistle (10)
 George Cocchini – additional acoustic guitar (10)
 Cobb Mass Choir – backing vocals (1, 5)
 Dr. Oral Moses – choir director (1, 5)
 Tabitha Fair – backing vocals (5)

Production

 Monroe Jones – producer (1, 2, 5, 7, 10)
 Third Day – producers (3, 4, 6, 8, 9, 11)
 Joey Canaday – producer (11), engineer (11)
 Bob Wohler – executive producer
 Jim Dineen – engineer (1, 2, 5, 7, 10), mixing at The Castle, Franklin, Tennessee and The Sound Kitchen, Franklin, Tennessee
 Karl Egsieker – engineer (1, 2, 5, 7, 10)
 Ryan Williams – engineer (1, 2, 5, 7, 10)
 Andrew Stone – engineer (3, 4, 6, 8, 9, 11)
 Scott Ragsdale – assistant engineer (11)
 Sam Wehrmeyer – assistant engineer (11)
 Ken George – live audio engineer
 Jed Hackett – mix assistant
 Melissa Mattey – mix assistant
 Fred Paragano – additional programming and editing at Paragon Audio Productions, Franklin, Tennessee
 Stephen Marcussen – mastering at Stephen Marcussen Mastering, Los Angeles, California
 Michelle Pearson – A&R coordination
 Bert Sumner – design, cover and church photography
 Tom DiPace – live photography
 Ben Pearson – band photography
 Jordyn Thomas – artist development

Charts

References

Third Day albums
2000 albums
Essential Records (Christian) albums